In physics and mathematics, the κ-Poincaré algebra, named after Henri Poincaré, is a deformation of the Poincaré algebra into a Hopf algebra. In the bicrossproduct basis, introduced by Majid-Ruegg its commutation rules reads:

 
 
 

Where  are the translation generators,  the rotations and  the boosts.
The coproducts are:
 
 
 

The antipodes and the counits:
 
 
 
 
 
 
 
 

The κ-Poincaré algebra is the dual Hopf algebra to the κ-Poincaré group, and can be interpreted as its “infinitesimal” version.

References

Hopf algebras
Mathematical physics